Prosopocera angolensis is a species of beetle in the family Cerambycidae. It was described by Quedenfeldt in 1885. It has a wide distribution throughout Africa.

References

Prosopocerini
Beetles described in 1885